Nicola Monachesi (1795–1851) was an Italian painter believed to have painted the earliest frescos in America. He was born in Tolentino, Marche Italy and was considered a citizen of Rome. When he died in Philadelphia, he had become a naturalized citizen of the United States.  In Italy he was a pupil of the Accademia di San Luca, Rome, studying under Gaspare Landi, and won his first prize for painting. After studying in Rome, he emigrated to America in 1831-32 entering through New York and settling in Philadelphia. He worked mostly as an interior decorator, drawing neoclassical artistic paintings on wall surfaces and portrait paintings on canvass decorating churches, commercial buildings, and Mansions.

Works
Works surviving and preserved are:
 St. Augustine Church, Philadelphia Fresco paintings.
 Richard Alsop IV House in Connecticut, (now owned by Wesleyan University) interior decorative wall paintings are attributed to Monachesi. It is believed that his work in the Merchants' Exchange Building (Philadelphia) impressed the owner, who had an office in the Exchange and invited Monachesi to travel out of Philadelphia. The works highlighted are stair hall painting displays, in the style of trompe-l'œil of figures in niches, while oil-on-plaster paintings are featured in the parlors, dining room and morning-room. The parlor paintings are classical derivations and some subjects are Raphaelesque in origin. In the morning room the formal classicism of the parlors is replaced by scenes derived from the "rural" Italian tradition of wall decoration. Local birds and insects are featured in these scenes. The dining room displays a painted frieze. These works exist today and are on display being preserved by the University.

Works demolished or destroyed:
 Merchants' Exchange Building (Philadelphia), a building designed by  architect, William Strickland Interior of the Exchange room with wall paintings, ceiling fresco's and an elegant mosaic floor  executed in the 1830s and artwork removed later during a building renovation. 
 St. John the Evangelist Catholic Church (Philadelphia, Pennsylvania) at 13th and Chestnut Streets. Interior paintings in 1830s at the then cathedral of the Diocese of Philadelphia.  Church and interior destroyed by fire 1899. 
 Matthew Newkirk's mansion residence at 13th and Arch street Philadelphia, designed by architect Thomas Ustick Walter. Interior decorative paintings and marble in 1834.  The decorations were carefully preserved until 1876 when it was sold to the St. George Society of Philadelphia and renamed "St. George's Hall". Building demolished 1903.
 Phil-Ellena the stately mansion of George Washington Carpenter located in Germantown Pennsylvania, now the West Mount Airy neighborhood of Philadelphia. Interior decorative paintings reflective of Ralphel's paintings in Rome's Vatican executed in over 20 rooms.  The Greek Revival styled mansion was sited on 600 acres, constructed in 1845 and demolished in 1892 during development of the Mount Airy neighborhood.
 Confectioner's George Parkinson  and his wife Eleanor Parkinson, shop at 180 Chestnut Street Philadelphia. Interior decorative ceiling paintings in 1840.  The owners had created a confectionery business that made Philadelphia vanilla ice cream a synonym for the city's haute cuisine. Their son James opened a restaurant in the early 1840s with an ice cream garden situated in the rear of the store. The wonderful marble mosaic floor and artwork was considered a "glorious painting" as a marriage of Jupiter and Juno and brought a par excellence of refinement to creating a place that both men and women could socialize (compared and departure from Taverns). Demolition date unknown.

Works Unknown status:

His portraits existed in many "old" established families in Philadelphia and vicinity. It included patrons as Stephen Girard, Madam Rush, Joseph Bonaparte and Joseph Togno. In 1841-42 his large historical picture, The Murder of Jane McCrea, was exhibited in Philadelphia. An exhibit of his work was held by the Pennsylvania Academy of the Fine Arts

References  

19th-century Italian painters
Italian male painters
American painters
Italian-American history
Italian-American culture in Philadelphia
19th-century Italian male artists